Year in topic Year 1014 (MXIV) was a common year starting on Friday (link will display the full calendar) of the Julian calendar, the 1014th in topic the 1014th year of the Common Era (CE) and Anno Domini (AD) designations, the 14th year of the 2nd millennium, the 14th year of the 11th century, and the 5th year of the 1010s decade.

Events 
 By place 

 Byzantine Empire 
 Summer – Battle of Thessalonica: Emperor Basil II launches a raiding expedition against Bulgaria. From Western Thrace via Serres he reaches the valley of the Strymon River, near Thessaloniki (modern Greece); the local Byzantine governor Theophylact Botaneiates defeats the Bulgarians.
 July 29 – Battle of Kleidion: Basil II defeats the Bulgarian forces, between the mountains of Belasitsa and Ograzhden, near the town of Kleidon. By order of Basil, almost 15,000 prisoners are blinded; Tsar Samuel survives the battle, but dies of shock. Basil earns the nickname "Bulgar-Slayer".

 Europe 
 February 14 – King Henry II arrives at Rome and is crowned Holy Roman Emperor together with his wife Cunigunde by Pope Benedict VIII in St. Peter's Basilica. Henry establishes the Diocese of Bobbio (Northern Italy) and returns to Germany.

 England 
 February 3 – King Sweyn Forkbeard dies at Gainsborough after a reign of five weeks. He is succeeded by Harald II who becomes king of Denmark, while Cnut is elected by the Vikings of the Danelaw as king of England.
 March – King Æthelred the Unready sends ambassadors to England, including his own son Edward to negotiate to reclaim of the throne at the invitation of the English nobles.

 Africa 
 Hammad ibn Buluggin adopts Sunni Islam and declares his independence from the Zirid dynasty (modern Algeria). He recognizes the Abbasid Caliphate in Baghdad as being the rightful caliphs and becomes the first ruler of the Hammadid dynasty (until 1028).

 Asia 
 Emperor Sanjō of Japan has an eye illness. Influential statesman Fujiwara no Michinaga schemes to place his 6-year-old grandson Prince Atsuhira on the throne rather than the Emperor's son.

 By topic 

 Religion 
 The Nicene-Constantinopolitan Symbol of the Faith is used for the first time during the Roman Mass, after Henry II, the newly crowned Holy Roman Emperor, asks the Pope to add it – together with the filioque clause. Prior to this date, the Creed has not been used at all during the liturgy.
 Wulfstan, archbishop of York in England, preaches his Latin homily Sermo Lupi ad Anglos ("Wulf's Address to the English"), describing the Danes as "God's judgement on England".

Births 
 May 11 – Anawrahta, founder of the Pagan Empire (Burma) (d. 1077)
 Al-Bakri, Andalusian historian and geographer (d. 1094)
 Cynan ab Iago, king of Gwynedd (approximate date)
 Iestyn ap Gwrgant, king of Morgannwg (d. 1093)

Deaths 
 February 3 – Sweyn Forkbeard, king of Denmark and England (b. 960)
 February 9 – Yang Yanzhao, general of the Song dynasty
 April 23 – Battle of Clontarf:
 Brian Boru, High King of Ireland
 Carnen Ua Cadhla, Irish nobleman
 Mathghamhain, Irish nobleman
 Murchad mac Briain, Irish nobleman
 Sigurd the Stout, Viking nobleman (earl)
 Tadhg Mór Ua Cellaigh, king of Uí Maine
 May 7 – Bagrat III, king of Abkhazia (Georgia)
 June 25 – Æthelstan Ætheling, son of Æthelred the Unready
 August – Pandulf II ("the Old"), prince of Benevento and Capua
 October 6 – Samuel, emperor (tsar) of the Bulgarian Empire
 November 11 – Werner, margrave of the North March
 November 26 – Swanehilde, German noblewoman
 Abu'l-Abbas ibn al-Furat, Fatimid vizier (or 1015)
 Al-Hakim Nishapuri, Persian Sunni scholar (b. 933)
 Brithwine I, bishop of Sherborne (approximate date)
 Giselbert I, count of Roussillon (Spain) (or 1013)
 Lu Zhen, Chinese scholar-official and diplomat
 Raja Raja Chola I, king of the Chola dynasty (India) 
 Rotbold II, margrave of Provence (approximate date)
 Theophylact Botaneiates, Byzantine general and governor
 Wulfnoth Cild, English nobleman (approximate date)

References

Sources